The Tsarevich's Chapel was a chapel on Peace Avenue (Myru Ave) in Mariupol.

History 

The chapel was erected by Tsar Alexander III to commemorate the rescue of his son Tsarevich Nicholas Alexandrovich of Russia (future Tsar Nicholas II) on 28 April 1891 by Prince George of Greece, Nicholas' cousin, who rescued the life of the Tsarevich (Ōtsu incident).  It was consecrated on May 5, 1895.

The building stood until it was demolished in 1934 by the Bolshevik government as part of the Atheist Five-Year Plan.

Gallery

References

External links
 Old Mariupol
 Misto Mariupol
 mrpl.city

1930s disestablishments in Ukraine
Buildings and structures in Mariupol
History of Mariupol
Religion in Mariupol
Demolished churches in Ukraine
Buildings and structures demolished in 1934
Mariupol